John Francis Henning (November 22, 1915 – June 4, 2009) was a U.S. labor leader, civil servant, and a former U.S. Ambassador to New Zealand (1967–1969) and Under Secretary of Labor (1962–1967). Called "one of organized labor's greatest leaders" and "legendary" for his defense of labor, he is also credited with a positive role in the defense of minimum wage laws and civil rights.

Biography
John Francis Henning was born in San Francisco, California, in November 1915 to lower middle-class Irish American parents. His paternal grandfather, Thomas Henning, was born in Rathfriland, County Down, Northern Ireland. His maternal grandfather was a member of Teamsters Local 85, one of the oldest Teamsters locals in the West. His father was a plumber and charter member of the United Association of Journeymen Plumbers, Gas Fitters, Steam Fitters, and Steam Fitters' Helpers of the United States and Canada who lost his job during the anti-union drives after World War I for his work with the Association of Catholic Trade Unionists. After graduating with a bachelor's degree in English literature from Saint Mary's College of California, he took a position with the Association of Catholic Trade Unionists in San Francisco in 1938, and in 1949 began working for the California Labor Federation (CLF) (the official American Federation of Labor organization in California) as administrative assistant to the Executive Secretary-Treasurer. In 1970, the CLF elected him as Executive Secretary-Treasurer, a position he held until 1996.

He was active in the Knights of the Red Branch, an Irish Catholic fraternal organization, in the 1940s, and a strong supporter of the Irish republicanism, the Irish Northern Aid Committee, and the Irish American Unity Conference. He also co-founded the Irish Literary and Historical Society in the 1945.

From 1959 to 1962, Henning was Director of the California Department of Industrial Relations. He served as Under Secretary of Labor in the U.S. Department of Labor from 1962 to 1967, where, as Nancy Pelosi noted in a 2000 tribute in Congressional Record, "he was instrumental [...] in preventing restaurants from counting tips as wages under minimum wage laws, and in encouraging the U.S. labor movement to take strong stands for civil rights." From 1967 to 1969, he was U.S. Ambassador to New Zealand. Henning also worked for civil rights during his term as Regent of the University of California from 1989 to 1997, responding to apartheid in South Africa by attempting to divest the University's holdings there.

He was a close friend and ally of labor leader César Chávez, and helped the United Farm Workers win passaged of the California Agricultural Labor Relations Act. He also successfully pushed for the restoration of the California Occupational Safety and Health Administration (CalOSHA) after it was abolished in 1988 by Governor George Deukmejian.

Henning was also a former regent or member of the board of trustees of Lone Mountain College and St. Mary's College of California. He served on the San Francisco Public Welfare Commission, San Francisco Fair Employment Practices Commission, and San Francisco Board of Permit Appeals.

In 1997, St. Mary's College of California created the Henning Institute to encourage and present scholarship on Catholic social thought. The John F. Henning Center for International Labor Relations was created by the Center for Labor Research and Education at the University of California, Berkeley in 1999 to promote the study of labor and policy research in the global economy.

Henning and his wife, Betty, had seven children (John Jr., Brian, Patrick, Nancy, Daniel, Thomas, and Mary). Betty Henning died in 1994. His son, Patrick, served as California state labor commissioner and then director of the state's employment development department.

John Henning died at his home in San Francisco on June 4, 2009, in his sleep after a long illness.

Awards and honors
Henning was named a recipient of the Ellis Island Medal of Honor in 1986.

He received honorary doctorates from Saint Anselm College, St. Bonaventure University, and St. Mary's College of California.

Notes

External links
California Labor Federation
Henning Institute, St. Mary's College of California
John F. Henning Center for International Labor Relations, University of California, Berkeley

1915 births
2009 deaths
People from San Francisco
Saint Mary's College of California alumni
American trade union leaders
University of San Francisco
Ambassadors of the United States to New Zealand
United States Department of Labor officials
Activists from California
20th-century American diplomats